Alembon is a commune in the Pas-de-Calais department in northern France.

Geography
A farming village located 11 miles (17 km) south of Calais, on the D191 road.

Population

Sights
 The church, dating from the fifteenth century.

See also
Communes of the Pas-de-Calais department

References

Communes of Pas-de-Calais